The Nelson Avenue–Fort Hill Historic District is a residential neighborhood in northwestern Peekskill, Westchester County, New York, United States. It encompasses 195 contributing buildings, 3 contributing sites, and 1 contributing object and contains many late 19th-century homes in relatively intact condition.

It was listed on the National Register of Historic Places in 2006.

See also
National Register of Historic Places listings in Westchester County, New York

References

Buildings and structures in Peekskill, New York
Historic districts in Westchester County, New York
Historic districts on the National Register of Historic Places in New York (state)
National Register of Historic Places in Westchester County, New York